Marquis Jacori Haynes Sr. (born December 16, 1993) is an American football defensive end with the Carolina Panthers of the National Football League (NFL). He played college football at Ole Miss.

Early years
Haynes attended University Christian School in Jacksonville, Florida and spent a year at Fork Union Military Academy. He committed to play college football at the University of Louisville and University of North Carolina before settling on the University of Mississippi (Ole Miss).

College career
As a freshman at Ole Miss in 2014, Haynes played in all 13 games with four starts, recording a school freshman record 7.5 sacks and 31 tackles. As a sophomore, he was named second-team All-SEC after he started 12 of 13 games, finishing with 43 tackles and 10 sacks.

Professional career

Haynes was drafted by the Carolina Panthers in the fourth round (136th overall) of the 2018 NFL Draft. On November 27, 2021, Haynes was placed on the COVID-19 reserve list along with three others.

On March 15, 2022, Haynes signed a two-year contract extension with the Panthers.

References

External links
Ole Miss Rebels bio

1993 births
Living people
University Christian School alumni
Players of American football from Jacksonville, Florida
American football defensive ends
Ole Miss Rebels football players
Carolina Panthers players